was an autobahn in western Germany, connecting Jüchen and Grevenbroich, partly replacing the Bundesstraße 59. It was two lanes in each direction. There was no speed limit and very little traffic on this autobahn.

History 
From 1999 to 2005 this road have been used as a filming location for RTL Television series Alarm für Cobra 11 – Die Autobahnpolizei.

In 2020, the A 540 was downgraded to a Bundesstraße (federal road), and designated as part of the B 59.

Exit list 

|}

References

External links 

540
A540